Cape Surprise is a cape marking the northern end of Longhorn Spurs, between Massam and Barrett Glaciers, at the edge of the Ross Ice Shelf. It is composed of rocks of the Beacon and Ferrar groups. So named by the Southern Party of New Zealand Geological Survey Antarctic Expedition (NZGSAE) (1963–64) because this is the first place where rocks of these groups have been found on the coast, surprising the geologists.

References

Headlands of the Ross Dependency
Dufek Coast